Maharshi Karve Stree Shikshan Samstha is an Indian education society engaged in women's education. It was set up by Dhondo Keshav Karve in 1896 as Hingane Stree Shikshan Samstha.

History
In 1896, Dhondo Keshav Karve founded an institution in a village named Hingne near Pune city. Karve dedicated his life for the humanitarian objective which was upliftment of women which formed the major section of socially downtrodden during that period

On 14 June 1896, Karve started "Home for widows" along with the school for widows in a small village named Hingne in Pune. The Home for Widows was then named "Hingne Stree Shikshan Samstha" and the school was named "Mahilashram High School". Later the institution was renamed "Maharshi Karve Stree Shikshan Samstha".

The institution has expanded and is running 60 educational units having diversified branches all over Maharashtra with units located at Pune, Wai, Ratnagiri, Nagpur, Kamshet, etc. All these units are meant only for girls. The institution has now established branches like engineering, architecture, management, nursing, fashion technology, vocational training institute, Etc.

Institutes run by Shikshan Samstha
 1991 - Cummins College of Engineering for Women
 1994 - Dr. Bhanuben Nanavati College of Architecture for women
 1996 - Hiraben Nanavati Institute of Management and Research
 1998 - School Of Fashion Technology, Pune
 M. N. Institute of Vocational Training
 K. B. Joshi Institute of Information Technology
 Cummins College of Engineering for Women, Nagpur

References

External links
Maharshi Karve Stree Shikshan Samstha, (MKSSS), Pune

Women's universities and colleges in Maharashtra
Organisations based in Pune
Engineering colleges in Maharashtra
1896 establishments in India
Educational institutions established in 1896